Kondrashi is a rural locality (a selo) and the administrative center of Kondrashovskoye Rural Settlement, Ilovlinsky District, Volgograd Oblast, Russia. The population was 846 as of 2010. There are 14 streets.

Geography 
Kondrashi is located in steppe, on the left bank of the Ilovlya River, on the Volga Upland, 23 km northeast of Ilovlya (the district's administrative centre) by road. Pisaryovka is the nearest rural locality.

References 

Rural localities in Ilovlinsky District